Katell Alençon (born 9 October 1986) is a French Paralympic cyclist who competes in road cycling at international cycling competitions. She is a World silver medalist and a double European champion, she has competed at the 2016 and 2020 Summer Paralympics. She rides for Cofidis and Handisport Brest.

Personal life
Alençon was interested in cycling at a young age, she would often cycle to school, she joined her first cycling club in 2001. At the aged of 25 in 2007, Alençon fell off her bicycle while getting off her bike after a training session and badly sprained her ankle, she needed to use a wheelchair for five years. She had complications and extreme pain after her injury and had her right tibia amputated in 2011. She discovered Paralympic cycling while watching the cycling at the 2012 Summer Paralympics at home, she then began her Paralympic cycling career in 2014 and competed for France at the 2016 Summer Paralympics where she was the only French female cyclist out of a team of nine cyclists.

References

External links
 
 

1986 births
Living people
Sportspeople from Brest, France
Paralympic cyclists of France
French female cyclists
Cyclists at the 2016 Summer Paralympics
Cyclists at the 2020 Summer Paralympics
21st-century French women
Cyclists from Brittany